Viktor Ajbek (9 September 1920 in Vukovar – 3 February 1993 in Zagreb) was a Croatian footballer who played international football for the Croatian national team.

Club career
He started playing with the youth side of Vukovar's NK Sloga before moving to top-flight club Concordia Zagreb. He was champion of Croatia with Concordia in 1942.

International career
He made his debut for Croatia in an October 1942 friendly match against Greece, it remained his sole international match.

References

1920 births
1993 deaths
Sportspeople from Vukovar
Association football forwards
Yugoslav footballers
Croatian footballers
Croatia international footballers
HŠK Concordia players